Universal Language is a 1977 album by the Southern soul band Booker T. & the M.G.'s. The album was recorded for Asylum Records, following the demise of Stax Records, of which the M.G.'s were an integral element, in 1975.

The album was dedicated to M.G.'s drummer Al Jackson, Jr. who was murdered in 1975;  the remaining members recruited Willie Hall to replace him on this album. The group would not record another album for seventeen years, returning in 1994 with That's the Way It Should Be.

Reception
The Allmusic review awarded the album 2 stars.

Track listing
All songs written by Cropper, Dunn, and Jones, except where noted

Side one
"Sticky Stuff" – 4:09
"Grab Bag" – 4:32
"Space Nuts" – 3:27
"Love Wheels" – 3:38
"Motocross" – 4:33

Side two
"Last Tango in Memphis" – 5:26
"MG's Salsa" – 5:27
"Tie Stick" (Cropper, Dunn, Jones, Johnny Stevenson) – 5:01
"Reincarnation" – 5:12

Personnel
Booker T. & the M.G.s
 Booker T. Jones – keyboards
 Steve Cropper – guitar
 Donald Dunn – bass guitar
 Willie Hall – drums
Technical
Austin Godsey, Toby Scott - engineers
Tony Lane - art direction
Jonathan Seay - cover

Notes

Booker T. & the M.G.'s albums
1977 albums
Asylum Records albums
Albums produced by Tom Dowd